Louise, Queen of Prussia is a 1931 German historical drama film directed by Carl Froelich and starring Henny Porten, Gustaf Gründgens, and Ekkehard Arendt. The film's art director was Franz Schroedter.

It depicts the life of Louise of Mecklenburg-Strelitz (1776–1810), the wife of Frederick William III of Prussia. It forms part of the Prussian film genre.

The film was produced by Porten's own production company, founded during the silent era when she was a dominant German star. The failure of the film led to the financial ruin of Porten's production company, and she appeared in far fewer films after this point.

Cast

References

Bibliography

External links 
 
 Luise, Königin von Preußen Full movie at the Deutsche Filmothek

1931 films
Films of the Weimar Republic
German historical drama films
German black-and-white films
1930s historical drama films
1930s German-language films
Films directed by Carl Froelich
Biographical films about German royalty
Prussian films
Films set in the 1790s
Films set in the 1800s
Films set in the 1810s
Films set in Berlin
Films based on Austrian novels
Louise of Mecklenburg-Strelitz
1931 drama films
Films set in the Kingdom of Prussia
1930s German films